Sony Xperia Ion is an Android smartphone developed and manufactured by Sony Mobile Communications. It was launched at the 2012 Consumer Electronics Show with Sony Xperia S.

Hardware
The device has a capacitive touchscreen display that measures 4.6 inches with a resolution of 1280 x 720 at 323 ppi with Sony's Mobile BRAVIA Engine reality display. The glass that the screen was made from is also scratch-resistant, and the screen supports multitouch which is also capable of displaying 16 million colours. The phone features a 12-megapixel camera capable of recording high-definition videos at 1080p at 30 fps with continuous autofocus, video light and video stabilizer. It also has a front-facing camera of 1.3 megapixels capable of recording 720p videos at 30fps. The device is equipped with a 1.5 GHz Dual-core Qualcomm Snapdragon processor with 1 GB RAM, 16 GB of internal memory, which also supports 32 GB external memory with NFC (Near Field Communication) enabled which can be used with Xperia SmartTags, or for low value financial transactions, as NFC becomes more widespread in use, with the appropriate applications from Google Play. The device also features a micro USB connector with USB on the Go support and a HDMI port for viewing photos and videos on a TV screen.

Software
The Xperia ion for AT&T (LT28at) was released with Android 2.3.7 Gingerbread but it has received an update to Android 4.0.4 on 26 September 2012. The HSPA version (LT28h) came with Ice Cream Sandwich pre-installed while the LTE version came pre-installed with Gingerbread and then was updated to Ice Cream Sandwich. The Xperia ion is fully Facebook integrated with the Timescape UI with Twitter. The browser supports HTML, HTML5, XHTML, Flash and CSS 3. The phone is also integrated PlayStation Certified which allows users to play PlayStation Suite games, and is connected to the Sony Entertainment Network, allowing users to access Music & Video Unlimited. The device has WiFi and WiFi hotspot functionality with Bluetooth connectivity and is also DLNA certified. Sony Xperia ion received the upgrade Android 4.1 Jelly Bean on 26 June 2013.

References

External links
 Official website

Android (operating system) devices
Ion
Mobile phones introduced in 2012